The 2008 Israeli Basketball League Cup, for sponsorship reasons Winner Cup 2008 (Hebrew: גביע ווינר, Gevi'a Winner), was the 3rd edition of the Israeli Basketball League Cup pre-season tournament. It was played between 12 October and 16 October at Malha Arena in Jerusalem and at Gan Ner Arena in Gan Ner. Hapoel Jerusalem has won the cup after beating Ironi Nahariya 84-69 in the final.
MVP was Timmy Bowers (Hapoel Jerusalem).

Tournament bracket
The teams were seeded according to their last season standings.

External links
 Winner Cup

2008
2008–09 in Israeli basketball